Katherine "Kate" Brown (1840–1883) was an employee of the United States Senate and the plaintiff in Railroad Company v. Brown (1873), a case decided by the United States Supreme Court. She was African-American.

Career
Brown was a US Senate employee "in charge of the ladies' retiring room".

Historical significance
Katherine Brown boarded a train in Alexandria, Virginia, when traveling towards Washington, D.C., on February 8, 1868. Brown entered "what they call the white people's car." As she was boarding, a railroad policeman told her to move to a different car. She replied, "This car will do." He told her the car she had entered "was for ladies," and "no damned nigger was allowed to ride in that car anyhow; never was and never would be."

The railroad police officer and another employee grabbed Brown and, after a violent struggle that lasted six minutes, in which she was beaten and kicked, threw her on the boarding platform, dragged her along the platform, and threatened to arrest her. She asked, "What are you going to arrest me for? What have I done? Have I committed robbery? Have I murdered anybody?"

Brown's injuries were so severe that she was bedridden for several weeks and spit up blood from hemorrhages in her lungs. {{cite court |litigants= Railroad Company v. Brown (1873)' |vol= |reporter= U.S. Senate|opinion= |pinpoint= |court= |date= June 17, 1868|url= https://www.senate.gov/artandhistory/history/resources/pdf/KateBrownReport.pdf|access-date= November 4, 2022|quote= |postscript= }}

Senators Charles Sumner and Justin Morrill called for a formal investigation, and Senator Charles Drake agreed. A resolution was passed on February 10, and a Senate committee heard testimony later that month.

Brown sued the railway company for damages and was awarded $1,500 in damages in the district court. The railway company appealed, and the case eventually went before the US Supreme Court. On November 17, 1873, in an opinion delivered by Justice David Davis, the Court held that racial segregation on the railroad line was not allowed under its Congressional charter, which stated "no person shall be excluded from the cars on account of race." Davis dismissed the company's "separate but equal" argument as "an ingenious attempt to evade a compliance with the obvious meaning of the requirement" of the 1863 charter and decided in favor of Brown.

The Court held that white and Black passengers must be treated with equality in the use of the railroad's cars:

Brown recovered from her injuries and remained a Senate employee until 1881.

Honors and awards
Congressional Black Associates, which supports Congressional staff, honored Brown by naming one of its Trailblazer Awards in her honor.

See also
List of 19th-century African-American civil rights activists

References

External links
 RAILROAD COMPANY v. BROWN, US Supreme Court, 84 U.S. 445, 21 L.Ed. 675, 17 Wall. 445 (1873)
Testimony before a Committee of the US Senate
Report of the Senate Committee on the District of Columbia, June 17, 1868 (No. 131, 40th Congress, 2nd Session)
 "Patronage and Protest in Kate Brown's Washington, by Kate Masur, Journal of American History'', 99(4), 1047-1071 (2013). https://doi.org/10.1093/jahist/jas650

1840 births
1883 deaths
Activists for African-American civil rights
People from Virginia
African-American activists
19th-century American women
Women civil rights activists
19th-century African-American women